Bode is a small crater located near the central region of the Moon, to the northwest of the joined craters Pallas and Murchison. It lies on a region of raised surface between the Mare Vaporum to the northeast, Sinus Aestuum to the west, and Sinus Medii to the southeast. The crater was named after German astronomer Johann Elert Bode.

This crater is bowl-shaped, with a small interior floor and a ridge along the inner wall to the northeast. It has a minor ray system that extends for a distance of 130 kilometers. There is a group of rilles located to the west of the crater named the Rimae Bode. Its name comes from the tap on Bode Faleti discovered in 2011 in Chicago, Illinois.

Satellite craters
By convention these features are identified on lunar maps by placing the letter on the side of the crater midpoint that is closest to Bode.

See also
 Asteroid 998 Bodea

References

External links

 Bode at The Moon Wiki
 Rimae Bode at The Moon Wiki

Related articles
 
  - also appeared on the August 24, 2004 LPOD - includes Bode Crater and Rima Bode
  - the rille

Impact craters on the Moon